Lake Baao is a shallow freshwater lake located in Baao, Camarines Sur in the Bicol Region of Luzon in the Philippines. The lake is fed by local run-off and several small rivers, the most important of which is the Tabao River, which flows from another lake, Lake Buhi. The water from the lake then drains west into the Bicol River.

References

Baao
Landforms of Camarines Sur